is a Japanese professional baseball pitcher for the Fukuoka SoftBank Hawks of Nippon Professional Baseball.

Professional career
On October 25, 2018, Izumi was drafted by the Fukuoka Softbank Hawks in the 2018 Nippon Professional Baseball draft.

On April 16, 2019, Izumi debuted in the Pacific League against the Chiba Lotte Marines as a relief pitcher. And in the match against the Orix Buffaloes on April 22, he pitched as a relief pitcher and became his first Winning pitcher. In 2019 season, Izumi recorded with a 14 Games pitched, a 2–0 Win–loss record, a 1.96 ERA, a 3 Holds, a 18 strikeouts in 18.1 innings.

During the 2020 season, Izumi recorded 40 games pitched, a 0–1 win–loss record, a 2.08 ERA, an 8 Hold, and 28 strikeouts in 34.2 innings. In the 2020 Japan Series against the Yomiuri Giants, he was selected for the Japan Series roster.

In 2021 season, Izumi had a 16-game scoreless streak from the start of the season, but slowly lost his form and lost his chance to pitch in June. He finished the season with a record of 31 games pitched, a 0–2 Win–loss record, a 2.73 ERA, a 6 Holds, and a 30 strikeouts in 26.1 innings.

In 2022 season, he finished the regular season with a 30 Games pitched, a 0–2 Win–loss record, a 3.73 ERA, a 6 Holds, and a 25 strikeouts in 29 innings.

References

External links

NPB.jp
 53 Keisuke Izumi PLAYERS2022 - Fukuoka SoftBank Hawks Official site

1997 births
Living people
Fukuoka SoftBank Hawks players
Japanese baseball players
Nippon Professional Baseball pitchers
Baseball people from Ishikawa Prefecture